Carbon Lighthouse is an American clean technology and property technology company that makes it profitable for commercial and industrial buildings to reduce carbon emissions. Primarily, Carbon Lighthouse offers software and professional services to analyze buildings and present building owners with energy reduction projects that reduce operating expenses while offering project paybacks between six months to five years. Carbon Lighthouse serves medical office buildings, full-service hotels, office buildings, large apartment buildings, industrial facilities, and schools. A portion of proceeds from projects are donated to its non-profit partner Carbon Lighthouse Association to purchase carbon allowances from government markets. The organization is headquartered in San Francisco.

Mission 
Carbon Lighthouse was created with the goal of using market forces to stop climate change. Solutions it offers are designed to scale to a diverse set of locations and markets, have a large potential environmental impact, and be profitably self-sustaining without government regulation or subsidies.

History 
Carbon Lighthouse was founded in 2009 by Brenden Millstein (CEO) and Raphael Rosen (President). The organization began with energy projects in California and Oregon and through the support of various social innovation competitions including the Echoing Green Fellowship, the Stanford StartX Fellowship, the Stanford Social Innovation Fellowship, and others. On March 13, 2018 Chief Executive Officer Brenden Millstein announced they had raised $27 Million from various sources to expand its engineering and marketing efforts.

Business approach 
Carbon Lighthouse’s business approach was designed to minimize the cost and time required to reduce energy consumption in commercial and industrial buildings. The organization does not focus on energy studies or capital-intensive retrofits, but earns income by delivering energy savings, primarily through the optimization of existing equipment already installed in buildings. Carbon Lighthouse engineers collect and analyze large amounts of data. The firm takes an entire building approach.

Carbon Lighthouse offers an efficiency PPA to reduce upfront project expenses.

Ghostbusters of Energy Efficiency 
Carbon Lighthouse’s data driven approach has led it to be known as “The Ghostbusters of Energy Efficiency."

References

External links 
 Carbon Lighthouse website

Environmental organizations based in the San Francisco Bay Area
2009 establishments in California
Organizations based in San Francisco
Renewable energy economy